Mathilde Schjøtt (née Dunker) (19 February 1844 – 13 January 1926) was a Norwegian writer, literary critic, biographer and feminist. She made her literary debut with the anonymous Venindernes samtale om Kvindens Underkuelse in 1871. She was a literary critic for the magazine Nyt Tidsskrift, and her play Rosen was published anonymously in this periodical in 1882. She was a co-founder of the Norwegian Association for Women's Rights in 1884, and a member its first board. She wrote a biography on Alexander L. Kielland in 1904.

Personal life
Schjøtt was born in Christiania, a daughter of Bernhard Dunker and Edle Jasine Theodore Grundt. She married the philologist and politician Peter Olrog Schjøtt in 1867, and they were the parents of Sofie Schjøtt.

References

1844 births
1926 deaths
Writers from Oslo
Norwegian literary critics
Norwegian women critics
Women literary critics
Norwegian women non-fiction writers
Norwegian dramatists and playwrights
Norwegian biographers
Norwegian feminists
Norwegian women writers
Women biographers
Norwegian Association for Women's Rights people